The 1903–04 Football League season was Small Heath Football Club's 12th in the Football League and their 4th in the First Division, having been promoted from the Second Division as runners-up in 1902–03. After spending much of the season in the relegation places, they won six of the last nine matches to finish in 11th place in the 18-team league. They also took part in the 1903–04 FA Cup, entering at the intermediate round (between the qualifying rounds and the rounds proper) and losing in that round to Manchester United after three replays. In locally organised competition, they lost to Aston Villa in the first round of the Birmingham Senior Cup.

Twenty-three players made at least one appearance in nationally organised first-team competition, and there were twelve different goalscorers. Forward Charlie Athersmith played in 37 matches over the 38-match season. Billy Jones and Freddie Wilcox were joint leading scorers with eight goals, all of which came in the league.

Football League First Division

League table (part)

FA Cup

Appearances and goals

Players with name struck through and marked  left the club during the playing season.

See also
Birmingham City F.C. seasons

References
General
 Matthews, Tony (1995). Birmingham City: A Complete Record. Breedon Books (Derby). .
 Matthews, Tony (2010). Birmingham City: The Complete Record. DB Publishing (Derby). .
 Source for match dates and results: "Birmingham City 1903–1904: Results". Statto Organisation. Retrieved 23 May 2012.
 Source for lineups, appearances, goalscorers and attendances: Matthews (2010), Complete Record, pp. 252–53. Note that attendance figures are estimated.
 Source for kit: "Birmingham City". Historical Football Kits. Retrieved 22 May 2018.

Specific

Birmingham City F.C. seasons
Small Heath